Josef Brönner (May 12, 1884 – January 21, 1958) was a German politician of the Christian Democratic Union (CDU) and former member of the German Bundestag.

Life 
From 1945 to 1946 he was District Administrator of the Mergentheim district. He was then elected to the freely elected constitutional state assembly of the state of Württemberg-Baden. He was a member of the German Bundestag from the first Bundestag election in 1949 until his death. He was always directly elected in the Crailsheim constituency.

Literature

References

1884 births
1958 deaths
Members of the Bundestag for Baden-Württemberg
Members of the Bundestag 1957–1961
Members of the Bundestag 1953–1957
Members of the Bundestag 1949–1953
Members of the Bundestag for the Christian Democratic Union of Germany